Supremacy is a 2014 American drama thriller film directed by Deon Taylor, written by Eric J. Adams, and starring Joe Anderson, Dawn Olivieri and Danny Glover. The film chronicles the real life events of March 29–30, 1995, perpetrated by Aryan Brotherhood members Robert Walter Scully Jr. and Brenda Kay Moore. After fatally shooting a police officer, neo-Nazi Garrett Tully, along with his companion, Doreen Lesser, breaks into a house and takes an African-American family hostage.

The film premiered at the Los Angeles Film Festival on June 12, 2014, and was released in the United States on January 30, 2015.

Synopsis
Recently paroled after serving a fifteen-year prison sentence, Garrett Tully meets Doreen Lesser to complete a drug errand for their incarcerated Aryan Brotherhood boss, Paul Sobecki. After fatally shooting a cop, Tully breaks into a house, where he and Doreen take an African-American family hostage. An ex-con himself, the family patriarch, Sonny Walker, attempts to understand the neo-Nazi's motives and get his family out alive.

Cast

 Joe Anderson as Garrett Tully
 Dawn Olivieri as Doreen Lesser
 Danny Glover as Sonny Walker
 Derek Luke as Raymond
 Lela Rochon as Odessa
 Evan Ross as Anthony
 Mahershala Ali as Deputy Rivers
 Julie Benz as Kristen
 Nick Chinlund as Hannity
 Robin Bobeau as Cassie
 Alex Henderson as Jamar
 Jenica Bergere as Gerardi
 Sean Taylor-Corbett as Pedro
 Tyrin Turner as Reggie
 Anson Mount as Paul Sobecki
 Hemky Madera as Miguel

Background

Supremacy is based on the true story of Robert Walter Scully Jr. and Brenda Kay Moore. On March 29, 1995, between the cities of Santa Rosa and Sebastopol, California, Scully and Moore were parked in a pickup truck outside the Santa Rosa Saddlery. Believed to be pondering a nearby business to rob, they were confronted at approximately 11:30 PM by Sonoma County Deputy Sheriff Frank Vasquez Trejo. As he approached the truck, Trejo was shot and killed instantly with a sawed-off shotgun by Scully, who then took Trejo's weapon and fled with Moore to a nearby house on Lloyd Avenue, taking an African-American family of six hostage. After twelve hours, Scully and Moore surrendered to deputies.

Scully was a member of the Aryan Brotherhood, but insisted during his trial that the killing of Deputy Trejo was an accident and not racially motivated; Trejo was Latino. Scully was nevertheless found guilty of first degree murder and sentenced to death plus 274 years (for 11 "related" felony convictions) on June 14, 1997. He is currently on California's death row, awaiting execution (as of 2015). Moore was sentenced to 14 years, and was later sentenced to a further seven years for her "involvement in a prison gang whose members included Scully".

Trejo was a 35-year law enforcement veteran; he had been serving the Sonoma County Sheriff's Office for 15 years, and was 58 years old at the time of his death. He was survived by his wife, son and daughter. His funeral was attended by more than 2,400 officers and citizens, and he was posthumously awarded the Gold Medal of Valor for dying in the line of duty.

Production

Development
After "floating around [for many years] as an independent filmmaker", Deon Taylor began looking for a "more serious project" to direct; one that would take him "out of the [horror] genre". In most cases, he couldn't find any that were "motivating". At the time, he had just finished directing Chain Letter, an independent horror film. It didn't "hit [Taylor]" the way he wanted, and Taylor claimed the only thing he learned from Chain Letter was "how to shoot [a film] quickly with no money".

While in Los Angeles, Taylor met with producer Vincent Cirrincione, who was "a fan of [his] work at the time". Cirrincione said he had "this script", but "didn't know" if it was right for Taylor because it was "one of those movies that could go either way". Taylor asked for the script and read it while flying back to Sacramento. He claimed to have called Cirrincione "immediately" after landing, and asked for a "few more days to wrap [his] head around the project". After reading the script a "few more times", Taylor "fell in love with [the] movie" and "called [Cirrincione] back". After "[making] a deal" with Cirrincione, Taylor had to find a producer willing to finance the film; he "ended up finding about a million dollars".

Background research
Taylor stated he "spoke with the family" that was taken hostage; having an "incredible conversation" with them about everything that "went down". He didn't "have enough time" to speak with Scully; who was on "death row" at the time, so he "couldn't get [an] entire story". Taylor said he "[solely] went with the family's perspective" because it was all "[he could] do".

Screenplay
The screenplay was written by Eric J. Adams, an award-winning producer, writer and journalist.  Adams also co-wrote Archie's Final Project (aka My Suicide), winner of 21 major international film festival awards including the Crystal Bear at the Berlin International Film Festival.

Casting 
Anderson, Glover, and Dawn Olivieri were the first to be cast; the announcement was made on February 9, 2012, by Indiewire.

On March 7, it was reported by Deadline that Anson Mount had signed on to portray Sobecki, the "nasty villain" and "head of the Aryan Brotherhood". Mount signed on for the role while taking a break from starring as Cullen Bohannon in Hell on Wheels, a western television series. The casting of Derek Luke, Lela Rochon, and Evan Ross was announced the same day.

Principal photography
Taylor couldn't achieve the "look [he] wanted" with an "HD camera", so he shot the movie on 16 mm film instead. Reportedly expensive, Taylor had to consult "all of the producers" beforehand, and although he didn't "have enough money" to use 16 mm film as much as he wanted, he did have enough to shoot "one or two takes" of each scene and "move on". Due to time constraints, principal photography lasted just 17 days.

The ethnic slur "nigger" is used heavily in the film; this caused "one day" of "really tough" filming for Taylor. The first day of principal photography involved a scene where "a black teenager, a young black baby, and Danny Glover" are all threatened with a gun; while being referred to as "niggers". Taylor said it was "very difficult to work" this way, and he had to sit down with each of the actors and explain to them what was going to happen beforehand. According to Taylor, it took "a few days" for everyone to "[get] into a rhythm".

Release
The worldwide premiere took place at the Los Angeles Film Festival on June 12, 2014; Deputy Trejo's family members were in attendance. On June 26, 2014, Well Go USA Entertainment acquired the North American distribution rights. A "red carpet event" was held at the Esquire IMAX Theater on January 14, 2015, in Downtown Sacramento, California. This was followed by a limited theatrical release on January 30 in the United States.

Critical reception
The film received mostly negative reviews. On review aggregator Rotten Tomatoes, the film has an approval rating of 20% based on 10 reviews, and an average rating of 3.9/10.  On Metacritic, the film has a weighted average score of 28 out of 100, based on 6 critics, indicating "generally unfavorable reviews".

Drew Hunt, of Slant Magazine, awarded one out of four stars, he wrote: "Taylor completely fails to visually represent any sort of interpersonal human dynamic", and "[It] isn't long before we feel like hostages ourselves, bound by the filmmakers' strained moral outrage". Chris Klimek, of The Dissolve, awarded one and a half stars out of five, describing the film as an "unpleasant exercise that is well-acted".

Martin Tsai, of the Los Angeles Times, gave a positive review. He praised Eric J. Adams for upping "the ante by creating dissent among the hostages", and was equally complimentary of Taylor, who "impressively paces the film with unrelenting tension".

Accolades
On May 6, 2014, Film Independent announced Taylor as one of eleven film directors nominated for the LA Muse Award. He ultimately lost to Delila Vallot; she won for directing Can You Dig This, her first feature-length documentary. Nominees for the 11th edition of the AMA Awards were announced on June 20, 2015, in Los Angeles, California. Supremacy was one of three film's nominated for the Best Diaspora Feature, and on September 26, 2015, it won.

Box office
There is no information on the film's box office performance or gross.

Home media
The film was given an R rating by the Motion Picture Association of America.

See also
List of films featuring home invasions

Notes

References

External links
 
 Supremacy at Metacritic
 Supremacy at The Numbers
 

2014 films
2014 thriller drama films
American thriller drama films
Drama films based on actual events
Films about neo-Nazis
Films about racism
Films directed by Deon Taylor
Films scored by Mike Einziger
Films set in the San Francisco Bay Area
Home invasions in film
Works about white nationalism
2014 drama films
2010s English-language films
2010s American films